Stockheim is a municipality in the district of Kronach in Bavaria in Germany. It is located on Bundesstraße 85, and on the touristic route Bier- und Burgenstraße (Beer- and Castle Road).

References

Kronach (district)